Skeleton Key is the third book in the Alex Rider series written by British author Anthony Horowitz. The book was released in the United Kingdom on July 8, 2002, and in the United States on April 28, 2003.

Summary

On the fictional island of Skeleton Key, off the coast of Cuba, three men meet and supply General Alexei Sarov with uranium. In the process they attempt to blackmail him into giving them a quarter of a million more dollars otherwise they will go to the American authorities. Believing this to be a threat, General Sarov switches off the runway lights when the plane is about to take off and turns on another set of lights that cause them to fall into crocodile-infested waters.

Meanwhile, after the events of Point Blanc, it is revealed that the real Alex Rider survived the fight with his clone. MI6 Chief of Staff John Crawley approaches Alex at school and offers him tickets to Wimbledon where he goes undercover as a ball boy to investigate a break-in. While managing to foil the Chinese Triad gang Big Circle's attempt at match-fixing, Alex is targeted by the triad gang. After a second attempt on his life is made while surfing on vacation with Sabina Pleasure, whom he befriended at Wimbledon, both MI6 and the CIA arrange to send Alex away for his own safety. He is partnered with two CIA agents, Tom Turner (renamed "Glen Carver" in American versions of the novel) and Belinda Troy, who are sent with him to Skeleton Key to investigate Sarov.

The CIA is concerned about the actions of Sarov and his meeting with Russian president Boris Kiriyenko (a childhood friend of Sarov's) in a few days' time. En route to Skeleton Key, the "family" of Alex, Turner, and Troy stop in Miami. Much to Alex's frustration, the two CIA agents are openly unhappy about bringing Alex and they attempt to withhold as much information from Alex as possible. Turner meets a criminal known as "the Salesman" on a classic motor yacht, the Mayfair Lady, (correctly) suspecting that the Salesman was involved in the sale of uranium to Sarov. The Salesman, however, is aware of Turner's true identity and plans to kill and dump him in the sea. Alex sneaks aboard the boat and causes a distraction by setting fire to it, before knocking out the Salesman by using a drugged dart in a special mobile phone (given by Smithers). While both Alex and Turner escape by jumping into the sea, the Mayfair Lady tries to run them down. Suddenly the ship explodes, killing everyone on board. Turner blames Alex for causing the explosion, but Alex insists he wasn't responsible. At this point, it is left ambiguous who causes the explosion.

In Skeleton Key, Alex notices a Geiger counter in a Game Boy Advance (Nintendo DS in later publications) console he was given by his "parents", deducing that Turner and Troy were sent to the island to search for a nuclear bomb. The two CIA agents reluctantly reveal their suspicions and their plan to infiltrate Sarov's residence – the Casa de Oro - by scuba diving into a cave underneath the house that features a ladder formerly used by smugglers that leads to the grounds. Alex goes with them but stays on the boat while Turner and Troy go underwater. When they do not return after a while, Alex dives in and, after a close encounter with a shark, discovers a mechanical spear trap disguised as stalactites and stalagmites that had impaled Turner and Troy, which kills the shark as well. When he resurfaces, Alex is captured by Conrad, Sarov's disfigured right-hand man, who drugs him. Although Alex reluctantly tells the truth when interrogated by Conrad, he decides to kill Alex anyway by feeding him into two large grindstones in a sugar mill. Sarov stops him at the last second and Alex passes out.

Alex wakes up in the Casa de Oro and meets with Sarov, who says he had known all about the cave, and he promises to tell Alex what he plans to do with him. He also reveals that Conrad planted an explosive on the "Mayfair Lady" to prevent the Salesman alerting the authorities. The next day, Sarov tells Alex about his son Vladamir, who was killed in the war in Afghanistan, and his plans to adopt Alex as he shares many traits with Vladamir, due to their similar physical appearance and personalities. He has Alex hidden in a former slave house when President Kiriyenko arrives. Alex attempts to escape the mansion by hiding in the boot of a car, but is caught by Sarov using a heartbeat detector. The general spares Alex's life yet again, but punishes him through psychological torture. At dinner, Sarov drugs Kiryenko and has him and his retinue imprisoned, before taking Alex, Conrad, the nuclear warhead and his security detail on Kiryenko's private plane to Murmansk, Russia, which contains a shipyard of decommissioned nuclear submarines.

During the flight, Sarov gloats at Alex, explaining that he plans to detonate the warhead in the shipyard to make appear as if one of the submarines has exploded. With Europe rendered uninhabitable by the resulting nuclear fallout and Russia blamed for the disaster, Sarov plans to release doctored footage to discredit Kiriyenko, ousting him from power while reverting Russia back to communism under Sarov. Sarov will then instigate wars across the planet until the entire world is united under a communist government, and plans for Alex to take over from Sarov in the future. When the plane makes a fuel stop in Edinburgh, Alex uses a stun grenade disguised as a Michael Owen (Wayne Rooney or Tiger Woods in other publications) keyring, again given by Smithers, to escape from the plane, temporarily incapacitating Sarov and Conrad. Alex attempts to call the police but is stopped by a security guard named George Prescott. Despite Alex's efforts to convince Prescott of the situation, Sarov recaptures Alex and Conrad kills the guard. The plane then lands in Russia, where Sarov reunites with a contingent of soldiers who all fought under him and are all fanatically loyal to his goal of world communist conquest.

At Murmansk, Conrad plants the bomb on a submarine using a crane. Alex is handcuffed to a handrail, and Sarov apologetically explains that he must kill Alex for his betrayal, planning for him to die in the explosion. After Sarov departs for Moscow, Alex sets himself free by stuffing rapidly-expanding chewing gum, the last gadget which Smithers provided him with, into the handcuff lock, causing it to break. He then fights with Conrad, who had decided to disobey the general and kill Alex himself. Suddenly, the Russian army and navy arrive and initiate a firefight against Sarov's men. Although Conrad outmatches Alex, Conrad (who has numerous pieces of metal inside his body following a failed bombing several years earlier) is caught by the crane's electromagnet passing overhead, pulling him into the magnet with extreme force which breaks his neck. Alex takes control of the crane, dropping Conrad's body into the sea and removing the nuclear bomb from the submarine. He then removes the detonation card, only to be told to put it back at gunpoint by an injured Sarov, who now plans to override the bomb, detonating it and killing all present at the shipyard but still setting his plan in motion. Alex instead throws the card into the ocean and rejects becoming Sarov's son. Unable to live with himself anymore, and to avoid being put on trial, Sarov shoots himself, committing suicide in front of Alex.

In the final chapter of the novel, it is revealed that when Alex explained his predicament to Prescott, his office heard their conversation through Prescott's radio, which was still turned on. They immediately notified MI6, who in turn warned the Russians. Alex is depressed after everything he has been through, but Sabina approaches him and invites him on holiday with her family in France for a couple of weeks, which cheers Alex up.

Graphic novel
In 2009 a graphic novel adaptation of Skeleton Key was released through Walker Books. This version altered some elements from the original novel, such as eliminating the attack on Alex while he was surfing in Cornwall, as well as having Sabina, already friends with Alex, attending Wimbledon as a spectator.

Reception
Critical reception for both versions of Skeleton Key was mostly positive, with Booklist giving the novel version a positive review. The print version of Skeleton Key was named as one of ALA's Quick Picks for Reluctant Young Adult Readers for 2004. The School Library Journal has given praise for both editions of the story, calling the print version "rip-roaring" while recommending the graphic novel as a pick for "reluctant readers".

References

External links
Official website of the books

2002 British novels
Alex Rider novels
Novels about organized crime
2002 children's books
Tennis in fiction
Novels set in Cuba
Novels set in Miami
Novels about communism
Novels set in Russia
Walker Books books